A Girl's Stratagem is a 1913 American drama film directed by  D. W. Griffith and Frank Powell.

Cast
 Mae Marsh as The Young Woman
 Charles West as The Lead Burglar
 Lionel Barrymore
 Kate Bruce as The Girl's Mother
 Harry Carey as The Girl's Sweetheart
 Dell Henderson as A Loafer
 W. Chrystie Miller as The Girl's Father
 Alfred Paget as The Saloon Keeper

See also
 Harry Carey filmography
 D. W. Griffith filmography
 Lionel Barrymore filmography

External links

1913 films
Films directed by D. W. Griffith
Films directed by Frank Powell
Silent American drama films
1913 short films
American silent short films
American black-and-white films
1913 drama films
1910s American films